Lillian Müller  (born 19 August 1951) is a Norwegian model and an actress in motion pictures and television. She was born in Grimstad, Norway.

Career
A "Page Three Girl" five times, her first appearance was in January 1974. Müller achieved her major breakthrough after being spotted by Suze Randall, who photographed her Playboy cover and shot her Playmate pictorial (the centerfold was photographed by Dwight Hooker). Müller appeared in the magazine as Playmate of the Month in August 1975, and was named Playmate of the Year in 1976.

Müller also appeared in Van Halen's music video "Hot for Teacher" as the physical education teacher. In 1978, she portrayed Rod Stewart's love interest in his video "Da Ya Think I'm Sexy?"

She is sometimes credited as Inga Anderssen, Lillian Mueller, Yulis Revel, Yuliis Ruval, Yulis Ruval or Yullis Ruval.

Filmography
 Rosemary's Daughter (1976) .... Annemarie Nitribitt
 Casanova & Co. (1977) .... Beata
 The Night They Took Miss Beautiful (1977) (TV) .... Lillie Schaefer
 Women in Hospital (1977)
 Hometown USA (1979) (as Yuliis Ruval) .... Mrs. Rodney C. Duckworth
 Once Upon a Spy (1980) (TV) (as Yuliis Ruval)
 Miracle on Ice (1981) (TV) .... Stewardess
 Death Ray 2000 (1981) (TV) (as Yuliis Ruval) .... Ilse Lander
 The Devil and Max Devlin (1981) .... Veronica (Devil Council)
 King of the Mountain (1981) .... Jamie Winter
 Best Defense (1984) (as Yuliis Ruval) .... French Singer
 Stewardess School (1986) (as Yuliis Ruval) .... Beautiful Blonde

Notable TV guest appearances
All as Yuliis Ruval:
 The Howard Stern Show
 Først & sist
 Remington Steele
 Magnum, P.I.
 Charlie's Angels
 Fantasy Island
 Starsky & Hutch

She was also featured in a Norwegian television show about Norwegian women having success in Hollywood, the show was titled Ja, vi elsker Hollywood! (Yes, we love Hollywood!)

References

External links
 
 
 

1951 births
Living people
1970s Playboy Playmates
Playboy Playmates of the Year
Norwegian film actresses
Norwegian television actresses
People from Grimstad
20th-century Norwegian women